Take a Girl Like You is a 1970 British romantic comedy drama film directed by Jonathan Miller and starring Hayley Mills, Oliver Reed and Noel Harrison. Based on the 1960 novel Take a Girl Like You by Kingsley Amis, it was adapted by George Melly.

Synopsis
Northerner Jenny arrives in a town near London, where she has taken lodgings with a Labour candidate in order to take up a job as a teacher. She quickly meets Patrick, who knows another girl at the lodging house but shares the goal, along with his friend Julian, of having sex with as many women as possible.

After a first date which ends at Patrick's flat for coffee, Patrick is shocked when Jenny tells him she is a virgin and intends to stay that way until she meets the right man. Jenny is attracted to Patrick, so they get into a volatile relationship as Patrick tries to change Jenny's mind, without giving up his bachelor status.

Cast

Production
Amis' novel was published in 1960. In April 1961, Roy Ward Baker announced he would make a film of the novel after he finished Flame in the Streets but the project did not happen. Baker later said he could not get a script he was happy with.

In April 1968, it was announced that producer Hal Chester would make a version of the novel under his new contract with Columbia Pictures. George Melly was writing the script and the director would be Jonathan Miller. Miller had directed for TV before, notably Alice in Wonderland and Whistle and I'll Come to You, but this was his first feature.

Miller admitted his "motives were slightly at fault in accepting the project to begin with. I was thinking that... well, Mike Nichols can make a lot of money, why shouldn't I? I accepted the project probably too eagerly. I think it was probably one of Amis' best novels but there were a lot of things to be said against filming it."

Miller says "the difficulties began to double" during scripting "because rather than let the script happen spontaneously, the producer sat in on its manufacture at almost every stage. I'm not saying he didn't work very hard and have the best intentions; it's just that his conception and our conception of the intentions were hopelessly at odds."

Miller says the story was "old fashioned" and that he and writer Melly "were forced into making" the story "even more old fashioned by making it more sentimental. Gradually I found myself boxed in to a very conventional, almost 1950s studio situation and the final cut was beyond my control."

Miller admitted "perhaps what we were doing was something quite dishonest in trying to steal in a realistic film inside the shell of a commercial enterprise. I don't think the two can be done."

In December 1968, Hayley Mills signed to star. Filming started March 1969 in London.

Reception
The film was a commercial and critical flop. It was the last film produced by Hal Chester and the only feature directed by Miller.

Filmink argued "For all its swinging trappings, at its heart this is a Rock Hudson-Doris Day-Tony Randall comedy with Oliver Reed as Rock, Hayley as Doris and Noel Harrison as Randall" adding "Mills claims the producer wanted a sexy comedy while Miller wanted a satire, which may explain why the end result was a mess."

References

External links
 
 
Take a Girl Like You at Letterbox DVD
Review of film at Variety

1970 films
1970 romantic comedy films
British romantic comedy films
Columbia Pictures films
Films based on British novels
Films set in England
Films shot in Surrey
Films based on works by Kingsley Amis
Films scored by Stanley Myers
1970s English-language films
Films directed by Jonathan Miller
1970s British films